The 1953 Scottish League Cup final was played on 24 October 1953, at Hampden Park in Glasgow and was the final of the 8th Scottish League Cup competition. The final was contested by East Fife and Partick Thistle. East Fife won the match 3–2, thanks to goals by Frank Christie, Charlie Fleming and Ian Gardiner.

Match details

References

External links
 Soccerbase

1953
League Cup final
East Fife F.C. matches
Partick Thistle F.C. matches
1950s in Glasgow